Józef Kocyan (born 14 February 1946) is a Polish ski jumper. He competed in the normal hill and large hill events at the 1968 Winter Olympics.

References

1946 births
Living people
Polish male ski jumpers
Olympic ski jumpers of Poland
Ski jumpers at the 1968 Winter Olympics
People from Wisła
20th-century Polish people